Wesenberg may refer to:

The German name for Rakvere, a town in Estonia
Wesenberg, Mecklenburg-Vorpommern, part of the Amt Mecklenburgische Kleinseenplatte, Mecklenburg-Western Pomerania, Germany
Wesenberg, Schleswig-Holstein, part of the Amt Nordstormarn, Schleswig-Holstein, Germany